The 2004–05 Argentine First Division season saw Américo Gallego's Newell's Old Boys win the Apertura title after a fierce battle against Vélez Sársfield for the supremacy.  Vélez soon got over the disappointment after winning the Clausura with Banfield finishing second despite playing most of the tournament with a young squad because they were also competing the Copa Libertadores de América.

Huracán de Tres Arroyos and Almagro were relegated to the Nacional B after lackluster performance while Argentinos Juniors and Instituto played the promotion against Atlético de Rafaela and Huracán, respectively. Both won their series and were able to stay in the top category of the Argentine Football.

Torneo Apertura

Top Scorers

Relegation

There is no relegation after the Apertura. For the relegation results of this tournament see below

Torneo Clausura

Top Scorers

Relegation

"Promoción" playoff

Argentinos Juniors wins 4-2 and remains in the Argentine First Division

Instituto wins 3-1 and remains in the Argentine First Division

Lower Leagues

Clubs in international competitions

National team
This section covers Argentina's games from August 1, 2004 to July 31, 2005.

For the Olympic Games results, please see here. Those results are not tallied here because the team is made of Under–23 players, not the full squad.

Friendly matches

2006 World Cup qualifiers

2005 FIFA Confederations Cup

External links
AFA
Argentina 2004–2005 by Javier Romiser at RSSSF.

 
Seasons in Argentine football
Argentina 2004
Argentina 2004
Football (soccer)
Football (soccer)